Norwich United Football Club is a football club based in Blofield, Norfolk, England.

History
The club was established in 1903 as Poringland and District, and initially played in the Norwich & District Business House League. In 1965 they joined Division Three of the Anglian Combination, which they went on to win at the first attempt. The club won the Norfolk Junior Cup in 1978–79, defeating Bradenham Wanderers 5–2 in the final. In 1980–81 they won the Norfolk Junior Cup again, beating Wroxham reserves in the final, and also won the Junior League Cup, defeating Acle 3–2. In 1983–84 the club won the Anglian Combination Senior Cup, beating Bradenham Wanderers 2–1. In 1987 the club was renamed Norwich United.

In 1987–88 the club were Anglian Combination Premier Division runners-up, before going on to win the title the following season, earning promotion to Division One of the Eastern Counties League. In their first season in Division One they finished as runners-up, but could not be promoted due to the inadequate facilities at Gothic. The following season saw them win the division; having relocated to Plantation Park, the club were promoted to the Premier Division. They won the League Cup in 1991–92. The club were relegated back to Division One at the end of the 1993–94 season after finishing bottom of the division. The club were Division One champions in 2001–02, securing promotion back to the Premier Division.

Norwich United were Premier Division champions and League Cup winners in 2014–15, but opted not to take promotion to the Isthmian League. However, after retaining the league title the following season, they were promoted to Division One North of the Isthmian League. In 2017–18 the club won the Norfolk Senior Cup, defeating Downham Town 4–2 after extra time in the final. However, they also finished bottom of Division One North and were relegated back to the Eastern Counties League.

Ground
The club initially played at the Poringland Memorial Playing Field, where they remained until moving to Heartsease Lane – the former ground of Gothic – in 1985 in order to achieve senior status. They relocated to Plantation Park in Blofield in 1991 in order to meet the ground grading requirements of the Eastern Counties League's Premier Division.

Plantation Park has a stand on one side of the pitch, which includes a seated section in the centre and terracing on either side.

Honours
Eastern Counties League
Premier Division Champions 2014–15, 2015–16
Division One champions 1990–91, 2001–02
League Cup winners 1991–92, 2014–15
Anglian Combination
Premier Division champions 1988–89
Division Three champions 1965–66
Senior Cup winners 1983–84
Junior Cup winners 1980–81
Norfolk Senior Cup
Winners 2017–18
Norfolk Junior Cup
Winners 1978–79, 1980–81

Records
Best FA Cup performance: Third qualifying round, 2021–22
Best FA Trophy performance: Preliminary round, 2016–17, 2017–18
Best FA Vase performance: Fifth round, 2015–16
Record attendance: 401 vs Wroxham, Eastern Counties League, 1991–92
Most appearances: Tim Sayer
Most goals: M Money

See also
Norwich United F.C. players
Norwich United F.C. managers

References

External links
Official website

 
Football clubs in England
Football clubs in Norfolk
1903 establishments in England
Association football clubs established in 1903
Sport in Norwich
Norwich and District Saturday Football League
Anglian Combination
Eastern Counties Football League
Isthmian League